The 1785 English cricket season was the 14th after matches have been first awarded retrospective first-class cricket status. The season saw no top-class matches played in the country.

Matches 
No top-class matches were played during the year, after just one had been played the previous year. A number of other matches took place and scorecards survive of several. These include matches played by sides playing under the names of counties as well as by teams such as Hambledon Club, the White Conduit Club and the Gentlemen of Kent.

References

Further reading
 
 
 
 
 

1785 in English cricket
English cricket seasons in the 18th century